Peter Fyffe (born 22 August 1951) is a former Australian rules footballer who played for  in the VFL.

He was recruited from Newstead in Carlton's country zone and went on to win consecutive Reserves best and fairest awards in 1971 and 1972. He was released from Carlton early in the 1974 season and went to Tasmania to play for Cooee.

References

Living people
1951 births
Australian rules footballers from Victoria (Australia)
Carlton Football Club players
Cooee Football Club players